ASG Technologies Group, Inc., doing business as ASG Technologies, is a provider of enterprise information management and IT System Management solutions software.

History, acquisitions and funding

ASG Technologies was founded in 1986 by Arthur L. Allen as Allen Systems Group.

In 2015, Allen Systems Group, became ASG Technologies Group under a consortium of new owners led by KKR & Co. L.P. and Evergreen Coast Capital, with Charles Sansbury as CEO.

In 2016, the company reported $240 million in annual revenue, 3,000 customers across 60 countries and 41 offices worldwide.

In 2017, Evergreen Coast Capital became the lead investor. As part of its evolution, ASG divested Atempo to focus on the core business.

On March 7, 2018, ASG acquired Mowbly, an innovative business process mobility platform company. By acquiring Mowbly, ASG can offer business process management with a mobile-first approach.

In April of 2021, it was announced that Rocket Software had purchased ASG for an undisclosed sum.

References

Software companies based in Florida
Mainframe computers
Companies based in Naples, Florida
Defunct software companies of the United States

1986 establishments in Florida
Software companies established in 1986
American companies established in 1986